Chanes may refer to:
 Chanés, an ethnic group of South America
 Chânes, a commune in eastern France
 Galileo Chanes, Uruguayan footballer

See also 
 
 Channes, a commune in north-central France
 Chane (disambiguation)